is the eighth single by the Japanese girl group Hinatazaka46. It was released on October 26, 2022, by Sony Music Entertainment Japan. Kyōko Saitō served as the lead performer for the title song for the first time. The single also features the first appearance of the group's fourth generation in their music release.

Background 
"Tsuki to Hoshi ga Odoru Midnight'' was announced on September 10, 2022, during the first concert of Hinatazaka46's nationwide Happy Smile Tour 2022 at the Aichi Sky Expo, followed by the first live performance of the title song. Kyōko Saitō served as center (lead performer), her first time for a title song and her second after 2017's "Soredemo Aruiteru".

Production and release 
The single was released in five versions: Type-A, Type-B, Type-C, Type-D, and regular edition. It is the first single released after the departure of Miho Watanabe from the group, and Type-A and Type-B included the video recording of her "graduation" ceremony concert at the Tokyo International Forum on June 28, 2022, which was also the group's final concert with 22 members from three generations. Type-C and Type-D included documentaries about the group's fourth generation members, who debuted in September 2022.

The title song music video, primarily filmed on location at the Gunma Astronomical Observatory, was released on September 18, and those of three of the B-sides have also been released. In addition to Saitō, the front row of the choreography features members who have been the centers of the group's previous main songs (Nao Kosaka, Mirei Sasaki, Shiho Katō, and Miku Kanemura).  is Saitō's solo song, her second one after 2018's "Igokochi Waruku Otona ni natta". "Blueberry & Raspberry" is the first music release by the fourth generation members.  was performed by Hina Kawata, Mirei Sasaki, Konoka Matsuda, and Mei Higashimura,  was performed by Suzuka Tomita, Miku Kanemura, Yūka Kageyama, and Hinano Kamimura, and HEY!

Manamo Miyata did not participate in the music recording of this single and had announced her graduation from the group due to health reasons.

On October 26, 2022, the rehearsal dance video for the title song was released.

"10-byō Tenshi", "Sonota Ōzei Type" and 	"Blueberry & Raspberry" were first performed on November 12–13, 2022, during Hinatazaka46's nationwide Happy Smile Tour 2022 at the on Yoyogi National Gymnasium 1st Gymnasium, while "Hey! Ohisama!", "Kodoku na Toki" and "Isshōichido no Natsu" were first performed on December 17–18, 2022, during the venue of Hinatazaka46's event Hinakuri2022 at the Ariake Arena.

Reception 
"Tsuki to Hoshi ga Odoru Midnight" sold 423 thousand copies within three days after release, according to Billboard Japan.

On "10-byō Tenshi", Real Sound commented that the four singers' well-balanced singing voices well expressed the "bittersweet" themes of first love and the end of summer, and that the "relaxed" song would likely be used to "cool down" between the group's more intense numbers during live performances.

Track listing 
All lyrics written by Yasushi Akimoto.

Type-A

Type-B

Type-C

Type-D

Regular Edition

Participating members

"Tsuki to Hoshi ga Odoru Midnight" 
Center: Kyōko Saitō
 1st row: Shiho Katō, Nao Kosaka, Kyōko Saitō, Miku Kanemura, Mirei Sasaki
 2nd row: Kumi Sasaki, Hinano Kamimura, Hina Kawata, Konoka Matsuda, Yūka Kageyama, Sarina Ushio
 3rd row: Suzuka Tomita, Hiyori Hamagishi, Mana Takase, Ayaka Takamoto, Akari Nibu, Mei Higashimura, Haruyo Yamaguchi, Marī Morimoto, Mikuni Takahashi

"Hey! Ohisama!" 
Shiho Katō, Nao Kosaka, Kyōko Saitō, Miku Kanemura, Mirei Sasaki, Kumi Sasaki, Hinano Kamimura, Hina Kawata, Konoka Matsuda, Yūka Kageyama, Sarina Ushio, Suzuka Tomita, Hiyori Hamagishi, Mana Takase, Ayaka Takamoto, Akari Nibu, Mei Higashimura, Haruyo Yamaguchi, Marī Morimoto, Mikuni Takahashi

"Kodoku na Toki" 
Kyōko Saitō / Solo

"10-byō Tenshi" 
Hina Kawata, Mirei Sasaki, Konoka Matsuda, Mei Higashimura

"Sonota Ōzei Type" 
Suzuka Tomita, Miku Kanemura, Yūka Kageyama, Hinano Kamimura

"Blueberry & Raspberry" 
Center: Rio Shimizu
 1st row: Sumire Miyachi, Rio Shimizu, Nanami Konishi
 2nd row: Haruka Yamashita, Yōko Shōgenji, Kaho Fujishima, Kirari Takeuchi
 3rd row: Mitsuki Hiraoka, Tamaki Ishizuka, Honoka Hirao, Honoka Kishi, Rio Shimizu, Rina Watanabe（4th Generations Song）

"Isshōichido no Natsu" 
Shiho Katō, Nao Kosaka, Kyōko Saitō, Miku Kanemura, Mirei Sasaki, Kumi Sasaki, Hinano Kamimura, Hina Kawata, Konoka Matsuda, Yūka Kageyama, Sarina Ushio, Suzuka Tomita, Hiyori Hamagishi, Mana Takase, Ayaka Takamoto, Akari Nibu, Mei Higashimura, Haruyo Yamaguchi, Marī Morimoto, Mikuni Takahashi

Charts

Weekly charts

Monthly charts

Year-end charts

Certifications

Notes

References

External links 
  

2022 singles
2022 songs
Hinatazaka46 songs
Oricon Weekly number-one singles
Songs with lyrics by Yasushi Akimoto